Mucilaginibacter angelicae  is a Gram-negative and non-motile bacterium from the genus of Mucilaginibacter which has been isolated from the rhizosphere of the plant Angelica polymorpha.

References

External links
Type strain of Mucilaginibacter angelicae at BacDive -  the Bacterial Diversity Metadatabase

Sphingobacteriia
Bacteria described in 2012